Independence High School is one of eight high schools in Roseville Joint Union High School District. The school is located in Roseville.

IHS Programs 
Independence High School offers an Independent Study program, and will open a Middle College Program in Fall 2022. Independence High School is part of the Roseville Pathways program within Roseville Joint Union High School District, which offers a variety of alternative education programs. IHS also offers many Career Technical Education (CTE) Pathways. Students at Independence earn an A-G high school diploma, and are able to take classes at Sierra Community College as a component of their high school coursework. IHS students attend school on a flexible schedule and complete some classes online.

IHS History 
Independence High School launched in 1986 as a district program.  In 1991, it formally became an alternative high school within Roseville Joint Union High School District.

In 2001 IHS moved to its current facility, creating a space for flexible instruction and independent study, office spaces for staff and classrooms for students.

Past Principals 

Ona Castaneda (1991-2007)

Rick Matteoli (2007-2009)

Debra Latteri (2009-2020)

References

https://www.rjuhsd.us/independencehs

High schools in Placer County, California
Public high schools in California
Buildings and structures in Roseville, California